Tringa, Mali is a commune in the Cercle of Yélimané in the Kayes Region of south-western Mali. The commune contains the four villages: Diakoné, Dialaka, Lambatara and Maréna. The administrative centre (chef-lieu) is Maréna. In 2009 the commune had a population of 12,509.

References

External links
.

Communes of Kayes Region